Gorewadi is a village in the Karmala taluka of Solapur district in Maharashtra state, India. It have one special thing is that some years ago one star is fall hear. Cause of on that pace one lake is formed. It more special thing is all time of year we get here water. So many Animals come on it lake for drink water.

Demographics
Covering  and comprising 134 households at the time of the 2011 census of India, Gorewadi had a population of 635. There were 335 males and 300 females, with 98 people being aged six or younger.

References

Villages in Karmala taluka